Ozell "Hoppy" Jones III (November 20, 1960 – September 7, 2006) was a professional basketball player. Born in St. Paul, Minnesota, his family soon moved to Compton, California and later to Long Beach, California so he can play high school basketball at Long Beach Polytechnic. Jones first played collegiate ball with the Wichita State University (1979–1981) and helped the Shockers reach the Elite 8 in his second year. He later transferred to Cal State Fullerton to play for the Titans in 1982-1984. He entered the 1984 NBA Draft and was chosen in the fourth round (90th pick overall) by the San Antonio Spurs. On October 24, 1985, Jones was waived by the Spurs. He later signed as a free agent with the Los Angeles Clippers on March 31, 1986 but played in only three games. After his stint in the NBA, Jones first played overseas in Italy (1986–1987) then spent the rest of his professional career playing in the CBA for the Cincinnati Slammers (1986–1987), Quad City Thunder (1987–1988), Tulsa Fast Breakers (1989–1990), Tri-City Chinook (1993–1994) and Oklahoma City Cavalry (1994-1995). He also participated in the USBL with two stints for the Miami Tropics in 1987 and 1988. After retiring, Jones operated a big and tall men's clothing store in Lancaster, California.

Death
On September 7, 2006, Ozell Jones was found by relatives shot dead in his apartment.  He was 45 years old.  According to police reports, Jones bled to death from a single gunshot wound to the upper torso.  The investigation on this case currently remains open.  He is buried in Forest Lawn Memorial Park in Long Beach, California.

Notable awards
 USBL Championship (1987)
 CBA All-Star (1990)

References

1960 births
2006 deaths
Albany Patroons players
American expatriate basketball people in Italy
American men's basketball players
Basketball players from Long Beach, California
Cal State Fullerton Titans men's basketball players
Cedar Rapids Silver Bullets players
Centers (basketball)
Cincinnati Slammers players
Deaths by firearm in California
Los Angeles Clippers players
Male murder victims
People murdered in California
Power forwards (basketball)
Quad City Thunder players
San Antonio Spurs draft picks
San Antonio Spurs players
Tri-City Chinook players
Tulsa Fast Breakers players
Wichita State Shockers men's basketball players
Long Beach Polytechnic High School alumni